The Mongol invasion of Volga Bulgaria lasted from 1223 to 1236. The Bulgar state, centered in lower Volga and Kama, was the center of the fur trade in Eurasia throughout most of its history. Before the Mongol conquest, Russians of Novgorod and Vladimir repeatedly looted and attacked the area, thereby weakening the Bulgar state's economy and military power. The latter ambushed the Mongols in the later 1223 or in 1224. Several clashes occurred between 1229–1234, and the Mongol Empire conquered the Bulgars in 1236.

The Mongol campaigns

In 1223, after defeating Russian and Cuman/Kipchak armies at the Battle of Kalka, a Mongol army under the generals Subutai and Jebe was sent to subdue Volga Bulgaria. Genghis Khan's troops were seen as invincible at that time. However, in late 1223 (or 1224), the Bulgars may have fought with the Mongols. After several sharp skirmishes with the Bulgars, the tiring Mongols moved back down to the Volga. Meanwhile, the Rus continuously attacked the Bulgar State trying to attain supremacy over their wealthy region.
In 1229, Ögedei Khan, sent another Mongol army under the command of Kukday and Bubedey to conquer the region. This force defeated Bulgar frontier guards at the Ural River and occupied the upper Ural valley. In 1232 the Mongol cavalry subjugated the southeastern part of the Bashkiria and occupied southern portions of Volga Bulgaria. 

Led by Batu Khan, Mongol forces numbering 25-35,000 invaded Europe in 1236. The Mongols preceded to besieged and sack Bilär, Bolghar, Suar, Cükätaw, and most other cities and castles of Volga Bulgaria; killing or enslaving virtually all inhabitants. Volga Bulgaria became a part of the Ulus Jochi, later known as the Golden Horde. The territory was later divided into duchies; each of which eventually received or gained varying levels of autonomy as vassals of the Golden Horde.

Population transfer
The surviving agricultural population was forced to leave the steppe lands. The majority settled along the Kama river and in adjacent areas further north. The area around Kazan, which was settled by Mari people some years before, became the nucleus of the ("Kazan Tatar") population. Kazan and Çallı became new major political and trade centers.

Some cities, such as Bolghar and Cükätaw, were rebuilt, but they were primarily trading centers and the population was not, for the most part, Bolgar .

Rebellions
After the Mongols left Volga Bulgaria to conquer the Russian land, the Bulgars rebelled, led by the nobility. The Mongols then returned and put down the rebellions.

Impact on the region
According to some historians, over 80% of the country's population was killed during the invasion. The remaining population mostly relocated to the northern forested areas (territories of modern Chuvashia and Tatarstan). Some autonomous duchies appeared in those areas. The southern steppe areas of Volga Bulgaria may have been settled by nomadic Kipchaks, and agricultural development suffered a severe decline.

Over time, the cities of Volga Bulgaria were rebuilt and became trade and craft centers of the Golden Horde. Some Bulgarians, primarily masters and craftsmen, were forcibly moved to Sarai and other southern cities of the Golden Horde. Volga Bulgaria remained a center of agriculture and handicraft.

Ethnolinguistic impact
The population of Volga Bulgaria was mostly Muslim. Under the influence of Bulgar culture, more and more nomadic Mongols and Kipchaks were converted to Islam. The language used by Muslims of the Golden Horde transformed into the Kipchak language, adopted by all Muslim Volga Bulgars. As a result of a later mixing of Kipchak and Bulgar, the literary language of the Golden Horde became what is now called the Old Tatar language, and eventually evolved into the modern Tatar language. Some of Bulgaria's non-Islamic population kept the Bulgar language, which was influenced by the Mari language, a language commonly used in the territories to which they had relocated. This led to the development of the modern Chuvash language.

Some historians hypothesize that during the rule of the Mongols, the ethnic makeup of the population of Volga Bulgaria did not change, remaining largely Bulgar and partly Finnic. Alternatively, some hypothesize that some Kipchaks and Russians were forcibly relocated to Bulgaria. Undoubtedly, some Bulgars were forcibly relocated to the territory of modern Astrakhan Oblast, the population of which was previously nomadic.

Volga Bulgaria's Muslim community preferred to call themselves Muslims (Möselmannar), but used the word Bulghar to distinguish themselves from nomadic Muslim Kipchaks. They did not call themselves Tatars until the 19th century. Russian sources originally distinguished Volga Bulgars from nomadic Tatars, but later the word "Tatar" became synonymous with "Turkic Muslim". To distinguish between themselves, they started to use names of the khanates: the population of Khanate of Kazan called themselves the people of Kazan (Qazanlı); this name was also used by the steppe Tatars and by the Russians.

Aftermath
In the middle of the 14th century some duchies of Volga Bulgaria became more independent and even coined their own money. The duchies were sometimes ruled by Bulgar nobles. In 1420s the Kasan Duchy (Kazan Ulus) under the Ghiasetdin's leadership became practically independent from the Golden Horde. In 1440s, all lands with Volga Bulgar population were included into the Khanate of Kazan, which was ruled by Mongol dynasties. The Khanate also included Mari and Chuvash lands, while the rulers of the territories of Bashkirs, Udmurts, and Mordvins were considered vassals of Kazan. These were the peoples that traditionally had been under the economic and cultural influence of Volga Bulgaria.

See also
 Bulgars
 Eastern Magyars
 Kazan Tatars
 Mongol and Tatar states in Europe
 Mongolia
 Mongol invasion of Europe
 Russo-Kazan Wars

Sources

 

Volga
History of Tatarstan
Volga Bulgaria
Conflicts in 1223
Volga Bulgaria
Conflicts in 1229
Volga Bulgaria
Conflicts in 1230
Volga Bulgaria
Conflicts in 1236
Volga Bulgaria